Farid Karam served as a member of the World Scout Committee.

In 1977, he was awarded the 119th Bronze Wolf, the only distinction of the World Organization of the Scout Movement, awarded by the World Scout Committee for exceptional services to world Scouting.

References

External links

Recipients of the Bronze Wolf Award
Year of birth missing
Scouting and Guiding in Lebanon
World Scout Committee members